Panakkad Sayed Hyderali Shihab Thangal (15 June 1947 – 6 March 2022) was a sayyid (thangal) community leader and religious scholar from Kerala, southern India who was the Kerala State President and Chairman, National Political Advisory Committee, Indian Union Muslim League from 2009 to 2022. He was also the Vice President of the Samastha Kerala Jam'iyyat al-'Ulama' (E. K. faction), the principal Sunni-Shafi'i scholarly body in Kerala.

Hyderali Thangal was a member of the Pukkoya family of Panakkad (north Kerala). He was the third son of P. M. S. A. Pookkoya Thangal (1913  – 1975) and the younger brother of Sayed Mohammed Ali Shihab Thangal and Sayed Umerali Shihab Thangal. He was the founding president of Sunni Students' Federation (S. S. F.), the student wing of Samastha Kerala Jam'iyyat al-'Ulama', in 1973. He graduated from Jami'a Nooriyya, Perinthalmanna in 1975. He led the Sunni Yuvajana Sangham (S. Y. S.), the youth wing of the Samastha Kerala Jamiyyathul Ulama, and later served the Malappuram District President, Indian Union Muslim League for around two decades.

Hyderali Thangal was elected as the successor to Mohammed Ali Thangal as the Kerala State President of Indian Union Muslim League in 2009. After Pookkoya Thangal, Hyderali Thangal was the only leader to head both the Muslim League and the Samastha Kerala Jamiyyathul Ulama simultaneously. He also served as the Chairman of Kerala Wakf Board. He was also the founding chancellor of Darul Huda Islamic University, Chemmad.

He died at the Little Flower Hospital in Angamaly, on 6 March 2022, at the age of 74. Shashi Tharoor, the diplomat-turned-politician, described the Thangal as a "diminutive giant of Kerala politics" as he tweeted about his death.

References

1947 births
2022 deaths
Indian Union Muslim League politicians
Islam in Kerala
Kerala Sunni-Shafi'i scholars
People from Malappuram district
Deaths from cancer in India